Return of the Boom Bap is the first solo studio album by American hip hop musician KRS-One. It was released in 1993 through Jive Records. Recording sessions took place at D&D Studios and at Battery Studios in New York. Production was handled by DJ Premier, Kid Capri, Norty Cotto, Showbiz and KRS-One himself. It features guest appearances from Ill Will and Kid Capri. The album peaked at number 37 on the Billboard 200 and number 5 on the Top R&B/Hip-Hop Albums in the United States.

The album produced two singles: "Outta Here" and "Sound of da Police". The latter reached number 89 on the US Billboard Hot 100. The track "P Is Still Free" appeared on the Menace II Society (The Original Motion Picture Soundtrack) labeled as a B.D.P. track. The track "Black Cop" was originally released as a 12" single and a track for the CB4 (Original Motion Picture Soundtrack), thus also labeled as a B.D.P. track.

In 1998, the album was selected as one of The Sources 100 Best Rap Albums. According to KRS-One, the album has sold over 300,000 copies.

Track listing

Sample credits
Track 7 contains a sample of "Inside-Looking Out" written by Eric Burdon, Chas Chandler and Alan Lomax and performed by Grand Funk Railroad
Track 9 contains a sample of "Kill the Bitch" written by Karen Christina Chin, Wycliffe Johnson and Cleveland Browne and performed by Sasha
Track 13 contains a sample of "Poinciana" written by Buddy Bernier, Nat Simon and Frederick Russell Jones and performed by Ahmad Jamal
Track 14 contains a sample of "Blackula" written and performed by Gene Page

Charts

Album chart positions

Singles chart positions

References

External links

KRS-One albums
1993 debut albums
Jive Records albums
Albums produced by KRS-One
Albums produced by DJ Premier
Albums produced by Showbiz (producer)